Antsahalava is a town and commune in Madagascar. It belongs to the district of Antanifotsy, which is a part of Vakinankaratra Region. The population of the commune was 29,556 in 2018.

Primary and junior level secondary education are available in town. The majority 98% of the population of the commune are farmers.  The most important crop is rice, while other important products are maize and cassava.  Services provide employment for 2% of the population.

References and notes 

Populated places in Vakinankaratra